Charles Cope may refer to:

Charles West Cope (1811–1890), English painter
Sir Charles Cope, 2nd Baronet (c. 1743–1781), British aristocrat
Sir Charles Cope, 3rd Baronet (1770–1781), of the Cope baronets

See also
Cope (surname)